Altındağ Incidents is a protest that took place on 10 August 2021 in Battalgazi neighbourhood of Altındağ district of Ankara, as a result of a quarrel between a Syrian group and 2 young people, and the Syrian group stabbed 2 Turkish young people. As a result of the incident, one of the young people lost his life and 2 people were detained. After this incident, crowded activist groups organized marches. These groups attacked the houses and shops of Syrians. Riot police and riot police were deployed to the tense areas. According to Ankara Security Directorate, 148 people were detained for their involvement in the incidents in Altındağ. 

Of the apprehended persons, 64 had records for crimes such as extortion, intentional injury, damage to property, manufacture of narcotics, theft, etc. Administrative action was taken against 29 of them, while judicial proceedings were initiated against 43 of them. Police started to control the entrances and exits of Battalgazi neighborhood. Following the incident, Altındağ District Governorate made the following statements:"Some of the demonstrations and incidents that took place in our Altındağ district this evening

and as a result of the intensive work of our security forces, it has ended as of the moment.

Our people are kindly requested not to rely on provocative news and posts."

References 

 
Altındağ, Ankara
2021 in Turkey